Ropica paruniformis is a species of beetle in the family Cerambycidae. It was described by Breuning in 1969. It is known from Borneo.

References

paruniformis
Beetles described in 1969